Veritas Academy is the first "University-Model school" opened in Florida. Founded in 2005 by President Rick Hermanns and the administrator, Kira Brown Wilson, under the name Veritas Preparatory Academy it began in Pinellas Park, Florida with 91 students. Serving students K-12th grade, Veritas moved to the campus of Indian Rocks Christian School (IRCS)in the fall of 2008 at which time Veritas Preparatory Academy became Veritas Academy in Largo, Florida. As a ministry of First Baptist Church of Indian Rocks, Veritas students join IRCS for athletics and fine art classes.

Veritas Academy is no longer operating as a school within First Baptist Indian Rocks or Indian Rocks Christian School.

Philosophy
Veritas is run on the philosophy of the National Association of University-Model Schools (NAUMS), and focuses on parents being involved in their child's education. It accomplishes this objective by having students K-6th grade receive classroom instruction at a central location two days a week and completing assignments directed by the teacher at home on the other days. Middle school students attend classes three days a week and complete assignments on the off days. High school students follow a collegiate schedule of classes, two, three or five days a week.

References

External links
 Veritas Academy home page
 NAUMS Homepage
 Indian Rocks Christian School

High schools in Pinellas County, Florida
Private high schools in Florida
Private middle schools in Florida
Private elementary schools in Florida
Buildings and structures in Largo, Florida
Educational institutions established in 2005
2005 establishments in Florida